Joe Robert Fuller is a former cornerback in the National Football League. He played with the San Diego Chargers and the Green Bay Packers. He also played in the Canadian Football League. Fuller was an all-conference player at the University of Northern Iowa.

References

1964 births
Living people
People from Okaloosa County, Florida
American football defensive backs
Canadian football defensive backs
Northern Iowa Panthers football players
Saskatchewan Roughriders players
San Diego Chargers players
Green Bay Packers players
Ottawa Rough Riders players
Shreveport Pirates players
Toronto Argonauts players
Minnesota Fighting Pike players